Lilu may refer to:

Lilu, Anambra State Nigeria, a town in Ihiala L.G.A of Anambra State Nigeria
Lilu (ancient China), a tribe or state in ancient China
Lilu (mythology), a creature in Akkadian mythology
Lilu (singer), an Armenian singer
Lilu, Estonia, a village in Estonia